Webster Glacier is a glacier in the Founders Peaks of the Heritage Range, flowing generally north between Frazier Ridge and Pipe Peak to enter Minnesota Glacier. Mapped by United States Geological Survey (USGS) from surveys and U.S. Navy air photos, 1961–66. Named by Advisory Committee on Antarctic Names (US-ACAN) for Charles W. Webster, United States Antarctic Research Program (USARP) meteorologist and member of the winter party at Wilkes Station in 1963.

See also
 List of glaciers in the Antarctic
 Glaciology

References

Glaciers of Ellsworth Land